Parnavaz may refer to:
Parnavaz I of Iberia
Parnavaz II of Iberia